Longtang is a town in Qiongshan District, Hainan, China. It is located on the west bank of the Nandu River approximately 15 km south of Haikou City, the capital of the province.

See also
Longtang Dam - a dam located at the north end of the town

References

Populated places in Hainan